Fish's Head was the fifth album under the name Fischer-Z, and second album by the new re-vamped Fischer-Z after being revived in 1987, despite the departure of Denis Haines and Alan Morrison from the group. This album carries on in the same style as its predecessor, Reveal. Fish's Head included the evocative "Say No" single, with a politically charged black & white Nick Brandt promo clip which was banned by Watts’ own record label on the grounds of it potentially "endangering the lives of their employees worldwide".

Track listing
All songs written by John Watts.
"Say No" - 4:03
"Masquerade" - 4:48
"It Could Be You" - 4:58
"Sticky Business" - 4:04
"Huba" - 4:02
"Oh Mother" - 4:49
"Just Words" - 4:26
"It's Only a Hurricane" - 4:26
"She Said" - 4:09
"Ho Ho Ho" - 4:51

Personnel
John Watts - lead vocal, guitar
Ian Porter - bass, keyboards
Steve Kellner - drums
Jennie Cruse - vocals

References 

1989 albums
Fischer-Z albums
Ariola Records albums